Louis de Koning (born 19 October 1967 in Brielle) is a Dutch former professional road cyclist.

Major results
Sources:

1985
 3rd  Points race, UCI Junior Track World Championships
1988
 1st Ronde van Midden-Nederland
 1st Ronde van Limburg
 3rd Overall Olympia's Tour
1989
 4th Tour du Nord-Ouest
1990
 1st Grote Prijs Beeckman-De Caluwé
 7th Grand Prix des Amériques
1991
 2nd De Kustpijl
 3rd Wingene Koers
1992
 1st Rund um Köln
 1st Grote Prijs Raymond Impanis
 1st Stage 2a Ronde van Nederland
 5th Grand Prix de Fourmies
 6th Japan Cup Cycle Road Race
 7th Overall Tour of Ireland
1st Stage 5
1995
 1st Ronde van Overijssel
 3rd Ronde van Limburg
1996
 1st Ster van Zwolle
 1st Ronde van Limburg
 1st GP Wielerrevue
 1st Stage 8 Olympia's Tour
 1st Stage 1 OZ Wielerweekend
1997
 3rd Ronde van Drenthe
 4th Brussels–Ingooigem
 10th Hel van het Mergelland
1998
 1st Ronde van Noord-Holland
2001
 3rd Road race, National Road Championships
 5th Tour Beneden-Maas
2002
 1st Omloop Houtse Linies

References

1967 births
Living people
Dutch male cyclists
People from Brielle
Sportspeople from South Holland